Pottenstein may refer to:

 Pottenstein, Bavaria, a town in Bavaria, Germany
 Pottenstein Castle, a castle therein
 Pottenstein, Austria, a town in the district of Baden in Lower Austria

 Potštejn, a village in the Czech Republic